This is a list of the songs that placed number one in the United States during 2022. The Billboard Hot 100 is a chart that ranks the best-performing songs in the US. Its data is compiled by Luminate Data and published by American music magazine Billboard. The chart is based on each song's weekly physical and digital sales collectively, the amount of airplay it receives on American radio stations, and its audio and video streams on online digital music platforms.

"As It Was", the lead single from English singer Harry Styles' third studio album Harry's House (2022), debuted atop the Hot 100 and spent 15 weeks at the top spot—the most for any song in 2022, and the longest reigning number-one song by a soloist in the 64-year history of the chart, surpassing "Candle in the Wind" (1997) by Elton John, "I Will Always Love You" (1992) by Whitney Houston, and "We Belong Together" (2005) by Mariah Carey. "Heat Waves" (2020) by English indie pop band Glass Animals topped the Billboard Year-End Hot 100, after reaching number-one on the weekly charts in its 59th week, breaking the record for the longest journey to number one, surpassing the 35-week tally of Carey's "All I Want for Christmas Is You" (1994). With 91 total weeks on the chart, the song dethroned The Weeknd's "Blinding Lights" (2020) as the longest-charting song in Hot 100 history.

"Anti-Hero", the lead single from American singer-songwriter Taylor Swift's tenth studio album Midnights (2022), was the best-selling song of 2022. It sold 327,000 digital downloads in its third week on the Hot 100, garnering the biggest sales week for a song in over five years, since Swift’s own "Look What You Made Me Do" (2017) sold 353,000 copies in its first week. "We Don't Talk About Bruno" (2021) by Carolina Gaitán, Mauro Castillo, Adassa, Rhenzy Feliz, Diane Guerrero, Stephanie Beatriz and the cast of Encanto broke the all-time Hot 100 record for the most credited artists on a number-one song (seven). It is the second chart-topper from a Disney animated film, after "A Whole New World" by Peabo Bryson and Regina Belle from Aladdin (1992), and the studio's only song that spent five weeks at number one. English singer Sam Smith and German singer Kim Petras became the first publicly non-binary and transgender artists, respectively, to top the Hot 100, after their 2022 single "Unholy" rose to the number-one spot. 

Twenty-three acts have reached number one in 2022, with twelve—Gaitán, Castillo, Adassa, Feliz, Guerrero, Beatriz, the Encanto cast, Glass Animals, Tems, Steve Lacy, Smith and Petras—reaching the top spot for the first time. Canadian rapper Drake is the only act to have garnered two number-one songs this year, with his 2022 singles "Wait for U" and "Jimmy Cooks".

Chart history

Number-one artists

See also 
 List of Billboard 200 number-one albums of 2022
 List of Billboard Global 200 number ones of 2022
 List of Billboard Hot 100 top-ten singles in 2022
 Billboard Year-End Hot 100 singles of 2022
 2022 in American music

References

United States Hot 100
2022
Hot 100 number-one singles